Spectrum Technologies Ltd is a British company, based in Bridgend, Wales, which designs and manufactures specialised industrial laser systems.

History
The company was established in 1989 as a wholly owned subsidiary of British Aerospace (now BAE Systems) as a spin-off from BAE's corporate research and development centre in Bristol to undertake the commercialisation of laser technology derived from BAE's R&D programmes which did not fit with the business of its main operating divisions.

Products
The company's first product introduction was the CAPRIS line of laser wire marking and processing systems, based on the ultraviolet laser wire marking process originally developed at BAE's laboratories in 1987, which was extended into a family of products, developed principally for the international aerospace market, for use in the manufacture and maintenance of complex aircraft electrical wiring systems. The company is the primary supplier of this technology on a global basis and has almost every major international aerospace manufacturer on its customer list.

In the early 1990s, the company developed several other products, including a system used to manufacture the aluminium microwave grid array for the communications antennae for the Orion communications satellite and R&D systems for medical applications.

Ownership
In March 1994, Spectrum Technologies was the subject of a management buy-out, which placed 80% of the company's equity with the management while BAE retained a 20% stake; BAE also took a royalty on Spectrum sales for a period of 10 years ending December 2004. In 1998, the company converted to Public Limited Company status, and in August 1998 its shares were introduced to the PLUS Markets in London.

Awards
In 1995, the company was a recipient of the Queen's Award for Export, and in 2000 won three export awards, including the company's second Queen's Award for Enterprise for International Trade, and in 2006 won a third Queen's Award for Enterprise for International Trade.

Overseas markets
In 1998, the company established Spectrum Interconnect Inc in the US, as a wholly owned subsidiary to provide sales and service of its CAPRIS laser wire marking products in the North American market. In 2001, the company acquired RtMc Inc of Phoenix, Arizona, a manufacturer of a range of complementary infrared laser wire stripping products, and Vektronics Inc of Vista, California, a competitor in the aerospace market. In 2003, these were merged into a single new operating company, Spectrum Technologies USA Inc., with offices in Phoenix and Dallas Fort Worth, Texas.

In 2007, Spectrum opened its Hong Kong based sales and service office to support the Asia Pacific market.

New Marketing
Republic of South Africa, Egypt, Nigeria, EACU.

References

External links
Company website

Companies established in 1989
Bridgend
Engineering companies of the United Kingdom